Saint James the Great is a 1610 painting of James the Great by El Greco, now in the Museo del Prado. The painting is key to Gregorio Marañón's theory that the painter used  mental patients at the Hospital del Nuncio as models.

It originally formed part of a series of works produced by the artist for the parish church in Almadrones, Spain, a series which represented a set of variants on a set of paintings of the apostles for Toledo Cathedral.

Bibliography (in Spanish)
 ÁLVAREZ LOPERA, José, El Greco, Madrid, Arlanza, 2005, Biblioteca «Descubrir el Arte», (colección «Grandes maestros»). .
 SCHOLZ-HÄNSEL, Michael, El Greco, Colonia, Taschen, 2003. .
 http://www.museodelprado.es/coleccion/galeria-on-line/galeria-on-line/obra/santiago/
 https://web.archive.org/web/20110519074858/http://www.artehistoria.jcyl.es/genios/cuadros/6417.htm

El Greco
1610 paintings
Paintings by El Greco in the Museo del Prado